Abdul Hakeem Khan was a former governor of the Khyber Pakhtunkhwa province of Pakistan and former Chief Justice of Peshawar High Court. He belongs to Swati tribe of Baffa, the largest Union Council of Mansehra District. He was appointed the Governor of North-West Frontier Province (now Khyber Pakhtunkhwa) when General Muhammad Zia-ul-Haq imposed Martial Law on 5 July 1977 and appointed all provincial Chief justices as governors of respective provinces. Khan died on 4 January 2007, aged 90.

References

Year of birth missing
Place of birth missing
Governors of Khyber Pakhtunkhwa
2007 deaths
People from Mansehra District
Pashtun people
Chief Justices of the Peshawar High Court
1910s births